Bernhard I may refer to:

 Bernard I, Duke of Saxony (c. 950–1011)
 Bernhard I, Prince of Anhalt-Bernburg (c. 1218-1287)
 Bernhard I, Duke of Saxe-Meiningen (1649–1706)